Judge Ryan may refer to:

Harold Lyman Ryan (1923–1995), judge of the United States District Court for the District of Idaho
James L. Ryan (born 1932), judge of the United States Court of Appeals for the Sixth Circuit
Margaret A. Ryan (born 1964), judge of the United States Court of Appeals for the Armed Forces
Sylvester J. Ryan (1896–1981), judge of the United States District Court for the Southern District of New York

See also
Justice Ryan (disambiguation)